Anya Liftig (born 1977) is an American performance artist.

Education
Anya Liftig received her Bachelor of Arts in English in 1999 from Yale University. She completed her Masters of Fine Arts at Georgia State University in 2004. She also has a certificate of advanced work from the International Center for Photography, which she earned in 2001.

Work
Liftig's work focuses on the body and its relationship to other bodies, other people, and the built environment. She is perhaps best known for her 2010 performance entitled The Anxiety of Influence, in which she sat directly across from artist Marina Abramović for most of the day at the Museum of Modern Art (New York) during Abramovic's performance entitled The Artist Is Present.

Solo exhibitions
2014
 Twin High Maintenance Machines, Panoply Performance Lab, Brooklyn, NY
2013
 All the Animals in the British Museum, AliKati Projects, London, England
2012
 I’m a Groucho Marxist, Public Art Performance Intervention, Flux Projects Commission, Atlanta, GA
 Crisp As a Twenty, [performance space], London, England
 The Human Factor, OVADA and Roves and Roams, Oxford, England
 Deliverance (w Clifford Owens, Laura Ginn, Jayson Munsson) Atlanta Contemporary Arts Center, Atlanta, GA
2011
 Falling/Flying, Highways Performance Space, Santa Monica, CA
 Ditties for the Dirty War, Center for Performance Research, (collaboration with Low Lives 3) Brooklyn, NY
2010
 The Anxiety of Influence, Guerilla Intervention into The Artist is Present at Museum of Modern Art, New York, NY
 The Nothings, University Art Museum, Pittsburg State University, Pittsburg, KS
2009
 What Might Have Been Lost, Middlesex Community College, Middletown, CT
 Jewbilly, Eyedrum, Atlanta, GA
 Amor Y Problems, Casa Tres Patios, Medellin, Colombia,
 Jewbilly, Joseph Slifka Center, Yale University, New Haven, CT
2008
 Rejection, INCUBATEChicago, Chicago, IL
 District Nest Street, Chashama Art Foundation, New York, NY
2006
 Collusion, The Tank, New York, NY
 Woven Room, collaboration with Angus Galloway, Part of The American Living Room Festival,
 HERE Arts Center, 3LGdDog Art and Technology Center, New York, NY
2004
 Unravel, Garage Projects, Stable 1897, Atlanta, GA
 Everything I Own, Youngblood Gallery, Atlanta, GA
 self-evidence, MFA Thesis Show, Gallery I, Georgia State University, Atlanta, GA
2003
 Baby Invasion, Eyedrum, Atlanta, GA
2000
 Ganderbill Holler, Abrons Art Center, Henry Street Settlement, New York, NY

Selected group exhibitions
2015
 Making It, Difficult, Neutral Ground Contemporary Art Forum, Regina, Saskatchewan, Canada
2014
 The Last Brucennial, Bruce High Quality Foundation, New York, NY
 Movement Research Festival, Issue Project Room, Brooklyn, NY
 Bushwick Open Studios, Spread Art, Brooklyn, Y
2013
 All Good Things, SOMA Arts, San Francisco, CA
 A Night of Liftig, Panoply Performance Laboratory, Brooklyn, NY
2012
 Approach, Lexington Art League, Lexington, KY
 Radical Pulse Performance Festival. Defibrillator Gallery, Chicago, IL
2011
 Direct Action 2011, Institut für Alles Mögliche, Berlin, Germany
 SPANE, Screening of Art in the Environment, FADO, Toronto Island, Canada            
2009
 The Feast, Pittsburg State University, Pittsburg, KS
2008
 Mama’s Arts, Buurhuris Bario, Ambachtgaarde, The Hague
 MADAD, Art as Social Change, El Dokan, Alexandria, Egypt
 Kindergarten, Manhattan Open Center, New York, NY
 Hersteria, Metropolitan College of New York, New York, NY
2007   
 Body Politic, Open Luggage, University of Chicago, Chicago, IL
2006   
 Visualizing TRANSCulture, University of Wisconsin-Madison Center for Visual Culture, Madison, WI
 Jenny Holzer Selects, Contemporary Arts Center, North Adams, MA
2003   
 International Human Rights Prize, w/Birgit Ramsauer, Nuremberg, Germany
 So Atlanta, Atlanta Contemporary Arts Center, Atlanta, GA
 Stalkers: a Kitchen Sink Joint, Mama Buzz Gallery, San Francisco, CA
2002
 Video Show, Saltworks Gallery, Atlanta, GA,
 No Agenda but Their Own, Dalton Gallery Agnes Scott College, Atlanta, GA
 All Small, Eyedrum Gallery, Atlanta, GA,
 Voices From Home, Appalshop National Touring Exhibition 2001-2002

Performances 
2015
 Liftig and I, w/ Tess Dworman, Center for Performance Research, Brooklyn, NY
2014
 Softer, Softest, Delicious Spectacle, Washington, D.C.
 LUMEN, Staten Island Arts, Staten Island, NY
 Anya Liftig and Sophia Cleary in Performance, Aux Projects, Vox Populi, Philadelphia, PA
 THROW, Chocolate Factory, Long Island City, NY
 7a-11d Festival, Fado, Toronto, Canada
 100 Performances for the Hole, SOMA Arts, San Francisco, CA
2013
 Emergency Index Live, Invisible Dog Art Center, Brooklyn, NY
 Conference of Theoretical Theater (Utopian Practices), Culture Push and PPL, Brooklyn, NY
 The Kitchen at Independent Art Fair, New York, NY
 Lapsody 4, The University of the Arts, Theater Academy, Helsinki Finland,
 Roots in Kentucky, Defibrillator Gallery, Chicago, IL
 La Desinvollture de Nos Gangsters, Les Salaisons, Paris, France
 Performancy Forum 25: Panoply Performance Lab, Brooklyn, NY
 Month of Performance Art-Berlin, Berlin, Germany
 Live Art Denmark Festival, Pumpehuest, Copenhagen, Denmark
 Peekskill Project V, Hudson Valley Center for Contemporary Art, Peekskill, NY
2012  
 PPL, Mana Contemporary, Chicago, IL
 Prophesy, Defibrillator Gallery, Chicago, IL
 Time Body Space Objects-Part 2, Anthony Greaney Gallery, Boston, MA
 Worman, (with Yelena Gluzman) part of the Prelude Festival CUNY, New York, NY
 Homage to Ana Mendeita, The Glasshouse, Brooklyn, NY
 iCan, Art as Social Action, IV Soldiers, Brooklyn, NY
 Nature Fetish, Panoply Performance Laboratory, Brooklyn, NY
 Brooklyn im Mai, Month of Performance Art, Performmer Stammtisch, Berlin, Germany
 Collective/Performative, Exit Art, (with Hector Canoage and Grace Exhibition Space) New York, NY
 Simultaneous!, IV Soldiers, Brooklyn, NY
 Dimanche Rouge, Petit Bain, Paris, France
 And Was it Love, Grace Exhibition Space, Brooklyn, NY
 Lock Up Performance Art 6, Bethnal Green Cark Park, London, England
 Hawk/Dove, Performmer Stammtisch, Berlin, Germany
 The Compendium, (collaboration with Remote Control Tomato), Vaudeville Park, Brooklyn, NY
 Crisp as a Twenty, Sucking Orange Gallery, Berlin, Germany
 Anima/Animus, KuLe Theater Berlin, Germany
 Butter Digger, Cuccifritos Gallery, New York, NY
2011
 Maximum Perception Performance Festival, English Kills Gallery, Brooklyn, NY
 Performance Art’s Doppelgangers, Populist Roots and Shadow Selves, Surreal Estate, Brooklyn, NY
 The Typhoon Continues and So Do You, Flux Factory, Long Island City, NY
 Bob the Pavillion, Untitled, Columbia University, New York, NY
 Fountain Art Fair, Art Basel Miami Beach, Miami, FL
 Sunday Brunch, P.S. 122, This Red Door Gallery, New York, NY
 Conference of Works, Operations and Participations, Panoply Performance Lab, Vaudeville Park, Brooklyn, NY
 Micromanagement, Performance Art Institute, San Francisco, CA
 Invasions of the Surreal Undergrowth, Grace Exhibition Space, Brooklyn, NY,                
 Art Salon, with Baby Skin Glove, Culture FiXXX, New York, NY
 Unconscious Subconscious, Grace Exhibition Space, Brooklyn, NY
 Fleshy February, Experimental Meditation Center of LA, Los Angeles, CA
 Art in Odd Places, Adoring Appetite, collaboration with Caitlin Berrigan, New York, NY
 Skowhegan Performs, collaboration with Caitlin Berrigan, Socrates Sculpture Park, Queens, NY
 Living Walls Performance Festival, Albany, NY
 DIMANCHE ROUGE, Networked Performance Event, Brooklyn, NY
 LUMEN, Staten Island Performance Art Festival, Staten Island, NY,
 Anatomy Riot, Loft Ensemble Space, Los Angeles, CA
 ITINERANT Performance Festival, Crossing Art Gallery, Flushing, NY,
 AUNTS Regular, Secret Space, Brooklyn, NY
 Spread Art, Wicked Awesome, Brooklyn, NY,
 Our World is Open, Grace Exhibition Space, Brooklyn, NY
 Low Lives 3, Networked Performance Around the World,
 Eating Love, Chez Bushwick, BOS, Brooklyn, NY
 SITE Fest, Arts in Bushwick, 3 rd Ward and Grace Exhibition Space, Brooklyn, NY
2010
 No Soul for Sale, with Casa Tres Patios, TATE Modern, Turbine Hall, London, England
 Burlesque Bugs, dir. Michael Freeman perf: The Flea Theater, Chez Bushwick, Joyce Soho, New York, NY
2009
 Performance in Crisis, Exit Art, New York, NY
 Mnemonic Fool, Wilmington Fringe Festival, directed by Michael Freeman Wilmington, DE
2007   
 Body Politic, Pathogeograhies, Mess Hall, Chicago, IL
 Smut, Galapagos Art Space, Brooklyn, NY
2006   
 Visualizing TRANSCulture, University of Wisconsin-Madison Center for Visual Culture, Madison, WI
2004
 d.u.m.b.o. arts festival, curated by d.u.m.b.o. arts center, Brooklyn, NY
  A Shot in the Dark, Atlanta Contemporary Arts Center, Atlanta, GA

References

External links
 Anya Liftig (official website)
 Anya Liftig recorded performances
 Healey, Dale Megan. "The Intimate Art of Active Reading." Hyperallergic. April 9, 2015.
 Liftig, Anya, Mohr, Matthew, and Low, Clarinda Mac in conversation with Andrea Kleine. "Looking at Dancers, Buildings, and People in the Street."  PAJ: A Journal of Performance and Art 37.3 (2015): 65-76.

1977 births
Living people
American women artists
Georgia State University alumni
Women performance artists
Yale University alumni
21st-century American women